KDSH-LP (107.3 FM) was a radio station licensed to Borger, Texas, United States. The station was last owned by Living River Ministries. In January 2010, the station had obtained a broadcast license from the FCC to operate at 67 watts of effective radiated power. KDSH-LP broadcast a religious radio format.

KDSH-LP's license was cancelled by the FCC for failing to file an application for license renewal by its August 1, 2021 renewal date.

References

External links
 

DSH-LP
DSH-LP
Radio stations established in 2005
2005 establishments in Texas
Radio stations disestablished in 2021
2021 disestablishments in Texas
Defunct radio stations in the United States
Defunct religious radio stations in the United States
DSH-LP